Brand New Me EP is the second EP from Chinese-American rapper MC Jin. It was released on December 11, 2012 under Catch Music Group.

Track listing

References

External links
 Brand New Me EP - Allmusic Credits
 iTunes
 Amazon
 Rapzilla
 Love Is Pop 
 Newh20

2012 albums
MC Jin albums